Fota is a genus of moths of the family Noctuidae. The genus was erected by Augustus Radcliffe Grote in 1882.

Species
 Fota armata Grote, 1882
 Fota minorata Grote, 1882

References

Amphipyrinae